Cristian Ezequiel Ferreira (born 12 September 1999) is an Argentine professional footballer who plays in midfield for Newell's Old Boys, on loan from River Plate.

Career
Ferreira was born in Córdoba. He made his debut for River Plate in the Argentine Primera División on 29 October 2017 coming on a substitute for Exequiel Palacios against Talleres Córdoba.

On 19 February 2021, Ferreira moved to Argentine Primera División side Colón, on a loan deal until the end of the season. Ferreira returned to River Plate ahead of the 2022 season. Until the summer, he played only two games for River Plate. On 29 June 2022 Newell's Old Boys confirmed, that Ferreira had joined the club on an 18-month loan contract costing $200,000 up front with a purchase option set at $2,000,000.

Career statistics

References

Living people
1999 births
Footballers from Córdoba, Argentina
Argentine footballers
Association football midfielders
Argentine Primera División players
Club Atlético River Plate footballers
Club Atlético Colón footballers
Newell's Old Boys footballers
Argentina youth international footballers
21st-century Argentine people